{{DISPLAYTITLE:C12H22O}}
The molecular formula C12H22O (molar mass: 182.307 g/mol, exact mass: 182.1671 u) may refer to:

 Cyclododecanone
 Geosmin